is the fifth single by the Japanese girl idol group HKT48, released in Japan on April 22, 2015. It reached number one on the Oricon weekly singles chart. As of June 1, 2015, it had sold 296,698 copies.

Details 
The centers in the title song are Haruka Kodama and Sakura Miyawaki. Haruka Kodama had previously had the center position in a HKT48 single (in the 4th single "Hikaeme I Love You!"), while for Sakura Miyawaki (who had already been a center in AKB48's 38th single "Kibōteki Refrain", together with Mayu Watanabe), it was the first center position in a single by HKT48.

Track listing

Type A

Type B

Type C

Theater Edition

Members 

 "Hohoemi Popcorn"
 Team H: Miku Tanaka, Nako Yabuki
 Team Kenkyūsei: Misaki Aramaki, Sae Kurihara, Erena Sakamoto, Riko Tsutsui, Hazuki Hokazono, Yūna Yamauchi, Emili Yamashita

"Daite Twintails"
 Team H : Yui Kojina, Hiroka Komada, Riko Sakaguchi
 Team Kenkyūsei : Misaki Aramaki, Sae Kurihara

Charts

Year-end charts

References

External links 
 Profile on the HKT48 official website
 Music videos on YouTube
 "12 Byō" (short version)
 "12 Byō" (full length version)
 "Chameleon Joshikōsei" (short version)
 "Hawaii e Ikō" (short version)

2015 singles
Japanese-language songs
HKT48 songs
Oricon Weekly number-one singles
2015 songs